Adeang is a surname. Notable people with the surname include:

David Adeang (born 1969), Nauruan politician
Kennan Adeang (1942–2011), Nauruan politician

See also
Adang (disambiguation)